The 1916 Bradford Central by-election was held on 21 January 1916.  The by-election was held due to the death of the incumbent Liberal MP, Sir George Scott Robertson.  It was won by the Liberal candidate James Hill, who was unopposed.

References

1916 elections in the United Kingdom
1916 in England
1910s in Yorkshire
January 1916 events
Unopposed by-elections to the Parliament of the United Kingdom (need citation)
By-elections to the Parliament of the United Kingdom in Bradford constituencies